Bakainia is a village  of Ghazipur district, Uttar Pradesh, India. Bakiania was the part of Mania village but later was separated and was made another panchayat.

References

Villages in Ghazipur district